Unbelievable!!!!! is a 2016 American film written and directed by Steven L. Fawcette, which parodies Star Trek. The film stars over forty Star Trek cast members. The film follows the exploits of four astronauts (one of whom is a marionette) on a rescue mission to the Moon that does not go as planned.

It was Nichelle Nichols's final film to be released before her death in 2022.

Summary
Unbelievable!!!!! follows the exploits of four off-beat astronauts (one of whom is a marionette) who travel on a rescue mission to the Moon. However, the people they find at the Lunar Base are not who they appear to be. The astronauts then find themselves trying to save the Earth from an alien invasion.

Cast

Release 
The film had its world premiere on September 7, 2016, at Grauman's Chinese Theatre in Los Angeles. Domestic distribution rights were acquired in June 2020 by Indie Rights.  The online premiere of the movie occurred on August 1, 2020.

References

External links 
 
 

2016 films
2010s English-language films